Awutu-Senya East is one of the constituencies represented in the Parliament of Ghana. It elects one Member of Parliament (MP) by the first past the post system of election. Awutu-Senya East is located in the Awutu/Effutu/Senya district of the Central Region of Ghana.

Boundaries
The seat is located entirely within the Awutu/Effutu/Senya district of the Central Region of Ghana.

Members of Parliament

Elections

See also
List of Ghana Parliament constituencies
Awutu/Effutu/Senya District

References

Parliamentary constituencies in the Central Region (Ghana)